Ometz is a moshav in central Israel. Located in the coastal plain near Zemer, it falls under the jurisdiction of Hefer Valley Regional Council.

Etymology
There are two theories as to the source of the name; one is that it is from the phrase "Ometz VeGvura" (Courage and Bravery); the second is that is an acronym for Irgun Mishuhrarei Tzahal (lit. Organisation of Demobilised IDF [soldiers]).

History
The moshav was founded in 1949 by demobilised IDF soldiers from the 32nd Battalion of the Alexandroni Brigade. The first border settlement in the Hefer Valley to be founded after the 1948 Arab–Israeli War, it was established on land that had previously belonged to the depopulated Palestinian village of Qaqun.

References

Moshavim
Populated places established in 1949
Populated places in Central District (Israel)
1949 establishments in Israel